Beta Aurigae (Latinized from β Aurigae, abbreviated Beta Aur, β Aur), officially named Menkalinan , is a binary star system in the northern constellation of Auriga. The combined apparent visual magnitude of the system is 1.9, making it the second-brightest member of the constellation after Capella.

In around one million years, Beta Aurigae will become the brightest star in the night sky.

Nomenclature 
β Aurigae is the star system's Bayer designation. The traditional name Menkalinan is derived from the Arabic منكب ذي العنان mankib ðī-l-‘inān "shoulder of the rein-holder". In 2016, the International Astronomical Union organized a Working Group on Star Names (WGSN) to catalog and standardize proper names for stars. The WGSN's first bulletin of July 2016 included a table of the first two batches of names approved by the WGSN; which included Menkalinan for this star.

It is known as 五車三 (the Third Star of the Five Chariots) in traditional Chinese astronomy.

Properties 

Beta Aurigae is a binary star system, but it appears as a single star in the night sky. The two stars are metallic-lined subgiant stars belonging to the A-type stellar classification; they have roughly the same mass and radius. A-type entities are hot stars that release a blue-white hued light; these two stars burn brighter and with more heat than the Sun, which is a G2-type main sequence star. The pair constitute an eclipsing spectroscopic binary; the combined apparent magnitude varies over a period of 3.96 days between +1.89 and +1.94, as every 47.5 hours one of the stars partially eclipses the other from Earth's perspective.  The two stars are designated Aa and Ab in modern catalogues, but have also been referred to as components 1 and 2 or A and B.

It is also an A-class subgiant, but is an unrelated background star.

At an angular separation of  along a position angle of 155° is a companion star that is 8.5 magnitudes fainter than the primary. It may be the source of the X-ray emission from the vicinity. The Beta Aurigae system is believed to be a stream member of the Ursa Major Moving Group.

See also 
 Algol
 Capella

References

External links 
 Menkalinan
 Image Beta Aurigae
 CCDM J05596+4457 Catalog
 Smithsonian/NASA Astrophysics Data System

M-type main-sequence stars
A-type subgiants
Am stars
Algol variables
Triple star systems
Ursa Major Moving Group

Menkalinan
Auriga (constellation)
Aurigae, Beta
BD+44 1328
Aurigae, 34
040183
028360
2088